Wahoo (Acanthocybium solandri) is a scombrid fish found worldwide in tropical and subtropical seas. It is best known to sports fishermen, as its speed and high-quality flesh makes it a prized and valued game fish. In Hawaii, the wahoo is known as ono. The species is sometimes called hoo in the United States.

Description
Its body is elongated and the back is an iridescent blue, while the sides are silvery with a pattern of irregular vertical blue bars. These colors fade rapidly at death. The mouth is large, and the teeth of the wahoo are razor sharp. Both the upper and lower jaws have a somewhat sharper appearance than those of king or Spanish mackerel. Growth can be rapid. They are among the fastest fish in the sea.

The wahoo may be distinguished from the related Atlantic king mackerel and from the Indo-Pacific narrow-barred Spanish mackerel by a fold of skin that covers the mandible when its mouth is closed. In contrast, the mandible of the king mackerel is always visible, as is also the case for the smaller Spanish mackerel and Cero mackerel. The teeth of the wahoo are similar to those of king mackerel, but shorter and more closely set together.

The barracuda is sometimes confused with the mackerel and wahoo, but it is easy to distinguish from the latter two species. Barracuda have prominent scales and larger, dagger-like teeth, and lack the caudal keels and blade-like (forked) tail characteristic of the scombrids.

Distribution
Wahoo have a circumtropical distribution and are found in Atlantic, Pacific, and Indian Oceans. Population genomic research using RAD sequencing indicates that two weakly differentiated fish stocks are in the Atlantic and Indo-Pacific Oceans, likely with a considerable degree of migration and gene flow between these populations.

Lifecycle
The eggs of the species are buoyant and the larvae are pelagic. Wahoo tend to be solitary or occur in loose-knit groups of two or three fish. Where conditions are suitable, they can be found in schools around 100 or more.

Ecology
Their diet is made up of other fish and squid. From a study surrounding the Western and Central Pacific Ocean (WCPO), an analysis of the stomach contents of wahoo indicated that their diet consists of 84.64% native fish, 14.26% cephalopods (e.g. cuttle fish), and 1.1% crustaceans. The gender ratio of wahoo favors females over males with ratios ranging from 1:0.9 (Puerto Rico) to 3.5:1 (North Carolina), which is common for most pelagic marine species.

Most wahoo taken from waters have a trematode parasite, the giant stomach worm (Hirudinella ventricosa), living in their stomachs, but it does not appear to harm the fish. wahoo

Fisheries

The flesh of the wahoo is white and/or grey, delicate to dense, and highly regarded by many cuisines. The taste has been said to be similar to mackerel. This has created some demand for the wahoo as a premium-priced commercial food fish. In many areas of its range, such as Hawaii, Bermuda, and many parts of the Caribbean, local demand for the wahoo is met by artisanal commercial fishermen who take them primarily by trolling.

Commercial
Although local wahoo populations can be affected by heavy commercial and sport-fishing pressure, wahoo as a species is less susceptible to industrial commercial fishing than more tightly schooling and abundant species such as tuna. Wahoo are regularly taken as a bycatch in various commercial fisheries, including longline fisheries for tuna, billfish, and dolphinfish (mahi-mahi or dorado). It is also taken in tuna purse seine fisheries, especially in sets made around floating objects, which act as a focal point for a great deal of other marine life besides tuna. In 2003, the South Atlantic Fishery Management Council issued a Dolphin Wahoo Fishery Management Plan for the Atlantic. The species as a whole, though, is not considered overfished.

Recreational
In most parts of its range, the wahoo is a highly prized sport-fishing catch. It reaches a good size, and is often available not too far from land; it is also a very good fighter on light to medium tackle. It is known in sport-fishing circles for the speed and strength of its first run. Recreational sports fishermen sometimes sell their catch.

Wahoo are successfully fished with live bait around deep-water oil and gas platforms in the Gulf of Mexico during the winter.

References

Further reading

External links
 Atlantic wahoo NOAA FishWatch. Retrieved 13 November 2012.

Scombridae
Mackerels
Sport fish
Fish of Hawaii
Cosmopolitan fish
Fish described in 1832
Taxa named by Georges Cuvier